The 1979 U.S. Pro Tennis Championships was a men's tennis tournament played on outdoor green clay courts (Har-Tru) at the Longwood Cricket Club in Chestnut Hill, Massachusetts, United States. The event was part of the 1979 Grand Prix circuit. It was the 52nd edition of the tournament and was held from August 20 through August 26, 1979. First-seeded José Higueras won the singles title and the accompanying $24,500 first-prize money. The doubles final was not played due to rain.

Finals

Singles
 José Higueras defeated  Hans Gildemeister 6–3, 6–1
 It was Higueras' 3rd singles title of the year and the 9th of his career.

Doubles
 Syd Ball /  Kim Warwick vs.  Heinz Günthardt /  Pavel Složil Not Played

References

External links
ITF tournament edition details
Longwood Cricket Club – list of U.S. Pro Champions

U.S. Pro Tennis Championships
U.S. Pro Championships
U.S. Pro Tennis Championships
U.S. Pro Championships
U.S. Pro Championships
Chestnut Hill, Massachusetts
Clay court tennis tournaments
History of Middlesex County, Massachusetts
Sports in Middlesex County, Massachusetts
Tennis tournaments in Massachusetts
Tourist attractions in Middlesex County, Massachusetts